Esthlogenopsis atlantica is a species of beetle in the family Cerambycidae. It was described by Monne and Monne in 2006. It is known from Brazil.

References

Pteropliini
Beetles described in 2006